Coos Bay Public Schools (Coos Bay School District 9) is a public school district that serves the city of Coos Bay, Oregon, United States.

Demographics
In the 2019-2020 school year, the district had 338 students classified as homeless by the Department of Education, or 10.35% of students in the district.

Elementary schools (K-2)
Eastside School 
Madison School

Intermediate school (3-6)
Millicoma School 
Sunset School

Junior High (7-8) 
Marshfield Junior High

High school (9-12)
Marshfield High School

Harding Learning Center
Alternative Instruction for Middle School (AIMS) 
Community Experience for Career Education (CE2) 
Destinations Academy 
Interim Program of Academic & Social Skills (IPASS) 
Resource Link Public Charter School (grades K-12) 
Teen Parent Program

References

External links
 

School districts in Oregon
Coos Bay, Oregon
Education in Coos County, Oregon